The Llewelyn Volcanic Group is an Ordovician lithostratigraphic group (a sequence of rock strata) in Snowdonia, north-west Wales. The name is derived from Carnedd Llewelyn, the highest peak in the Carneddau range where it outcrops.

Outcrops
The rocks occur across the Snowdon massif and the Carneddau and within the Capel Curig Anticline.

Lithology and stratigraphy
The Group comprises around 1400m thickness of ash flow tuffs, flow-banded rhyolites and breccias with a variety of volcaniclastic sediments erupted or sedimented during the Caradocian epoch of the Ordovician period. The Group comprises (in descending order, i.e. oldest last): 
Capel Curig Volcanic Formation
Foel Fras Volcanic Formation
Conwy Rhyolite Volcanic Formation

It also includes the Foel Grach Basalt Formation and the Braich Tu Du Volcanic Formation.

References

Ordovician System of Europe
Upper Ordovician Series
Geology of Gwynedd